Jericho is a masculine given name whose bearers include:

 Jericho Brown (born 1976), American poet and writer
 Jerricho Cotchery (born 1982), American National Football League player and coach
 Jericho Cruz (born 1990), Philippine Basketball Association player
 Jericho Nograles (born 1981), Filipino politician
 Jericho Petilla, Filipino politician, management engineer and businessman
 Jericho Rosales (born 1979), Filipino actor
 Jericho Shinde (born 1959), Zimbabwean football coach and former player
 Jericho Sims (born 1998), American National Basketball Association player

Masculine given names